The National Savings and Trust Company is a historic bank building located at the corner of New York Avenue and 15th Street, NW in Downtown Washington, D.C. It has also been known as the National Safe Deposit Company and the National Safe Deposit Savings and Trust Company.

History
It was designed by architect James H. Windrim and built in 1888. The Queen Anne Style building is constructed in red brick, and elaborately detailed with copper and terra cotta.

The building was added to the National Register of Historic Places on March 16, 1972, and is a contributing property to the Fifteenth Street Financial Historic District.

It is currently occupied by a branch of SunTrust Banks, based in Atlanta, Georgia. SunTrust took ownership of the structure when it acquired Crestar Bank, which had previously taken control of the National Savings and Trust Company.

See also

 National Register of Historic Places listings in the District of Columbia

References

Commercial buildings completed in 1888
Banks based in Washington, D.C.
Historic district contributing properties in Washington, D.C.
Office buildings on the National Register of Historic Places in Washington, D.C.
Bank buildings on the National Register of Historic Places in Washington, D.C.
Office buildings in Washington, D.C.
Queen Anne architecture in Washington, D.C.